Ramón Humet is a Spanish composer born in Barcelona in 1968. In 2006 he was awarded the Queen Sofía Prize for Escenas de pájaros, which also won the Montreal Symphony Prize the following year, and in 2008 he won the Ciutat de Tarragona Award for Gagaku. His music, influenced by nature and zen, has been described as atemporal, luminous, colorful, very meditative and organic by Pablo González, and as delicate and subtle, with high poetic imagination by Johathan Harvey.

Compositions

Opera
 Sky Disc (2012)

Orchestral
 El temps i la campana (The time and the bell, 2014-2015)
 Escenas de pájaros (2006)
 Gagaku (2008)
 Escenas de viento (2008)
 Música del no esser (2010)

Concertante
 3 Nocturnes for saxophone and orchestra (2001)
 And the World Was Calm, for piano and ensemble (2009)

Ensemble
 From the Meadows (2006)
 Jardí de haikus (2007)

Chamber music
 Mantra 2 (2002)
 Quatre jardins zen (2008)
 El jardí de Kinko (2008)
 Pètals (2009)
 Petites catàstrofes (2010)

Solo
 Escenes del bosc, for piano (2005–08)
 Meditació, for marimba (2007)
 Vent de l'Oest, for shakuhachi (2007)

Vocal
 Homenaje a Martha Ghaham (2011)

Choral
 Salve Montserratina (2011)
 Tres Ofertoris (2012)

Cobla
 El Montsant (2004)

References

1968 births
Living people
Spanish composers
Spanish male composers